Jari Vanhala (born 29 August 1965) is a Finnish former footballer who played at both professional and international levels as a striker.

Club career
Born in Helsinki, Vanhala spent the majority of his playing career in Finland, playing with Grankulla IFK, FF Jaro, HJK, FinnPa and Inter Turku. However, he also made one substitute appearance in the Football League for Bradford City during the 1996–97 season, playing for 18 minutes.

International career
Between 1992 and 1997, Vanhala earned 23 caps for the Finnish national side, scoring two goals, including appearing in five FIFA World Cup qualifying matches.

References

1965 births
Living people
Finnish footballers
Finland international footballers
Grankulla IFK players
FF Jaro players
Helsingin Jalkapalloklubi players
Bradford City A.F.C. players
FinnPa players
FC Inter Turku players
Kakkonen players
Ykkönen players
Veikkausliiga players
English Football League players
Association football forwards
Finnish expatriate footballers
Finnish expatriate sportspeople in England
Expatriate footballers in England
Footballers from Helsinki